Lindsay Bushman (born May 3, 1994) is an American actress who is best known for her role on The Young and the Restless as Summer Newman.

Early life
Lindsay Bushman was born in Jacksonville, Florida. From a young age she wanted to be an actress and finally convinced her parents to make the move to California at 15.  Lindsay's small screen debut was on CW's The Ringer in 2011. She portrayed Erica described as a 'hot mess'.

Career
She made her feature film debut in the film Hello Herman.

On May 11, 2012, it was announced the Bushman had been cast in the role of the Summer Newman in The Young and the Restless. Bushman made her first appearance on June 8, 2012 on a recurring basis. Nelson Branco of TV Guide Canada announced the news of Bushman's departure in his magazine, Soap Opera Uncensored in September 2012.

Bushman had a small bit role on General Hospital as a young Kate Howard in a flashback. Bushman revealed that she got the audition thanks to her agent and booked the role after a few callbacks and chemistry reads.

Filmography

References

External links 

http://www.tv.com/people/lindsay-bushman/
http://www.cbs.com/shows/the_young_and_the_restless/photos/114293/the-39th-annual-daytime-emmy-awards/10860/
http://tvsourcemagazine.com/2012/05/2623-lindsay-bushman-max-ehrich-cast-as-yrs-new-summer-fen/

Living people
1994 births
American soap opera actresses
American television actresses
Actresses from Jacksonville, Florida
21st-century American actresses